Berwick Bay was a steamer engaged in transporting supplies for the Confederates in the Mississippi River area. She was captured and destroyed on 3 February 1863 by Ellet's Ram Fleet as she came out of the Red River heavily laden with supplies for Port Hudson, Louisiana.  She displaced 64 tons and was named for Berwick Bay, Louisiana.

See also

Mississippi Marine Brigade

References

Ships of the Confederate States of America
Shipwrecks of the American Civil War